Pinetown is an unincorporated community and census-designated place (CDP) in Beaufort County, North Carolina, United States. As of the 2010 census it had a population of 155.

The community is located in northern Beaufort County in the Coastal Plain region of North Carolina.

Demographics

References

Census-designated places in Beaufort County, North Carolina
Unincorporated communities in North Carolina
Census-designated places in North Carolina
Unincorporated communities in Beaufort County, North Carolina